Beautiful World may refer to:

Albums
 Beautiful World (Arashi album), 2011
 Beautiful World (Big Head Todd album) or the title song, 1997
 Beautiful World (Connie Talbot album) or the title song, 2012
 Beautiful World (Paul Carrack album) or the title song, 1997
 Beautiful World (Take That album) or the title song, 2006
 A Beautiful World, by Robin Thicke, 2002
 Beautiful World, by Patrick O'Hearn, 2003
 Beautiful World, by Take 6, 2002

Songs 
 "Beautiful World" (Devo song), 1981
 "Beautiful World" (Hikaru Utada song), 2007
 "Beautiful World" (Westlife song), 2011
 "I.G.Y. (What a Beautiful World)", by Donald Fagen, 1982
 "Beautiful World", by Archive from Londinium, 1996
 "Beautiful World", by Bon Jovi from What About Now, 2013
 "Beautiful World", by the Chevin from Borderland, 2012
 "Beautiful World", by Colin Hay from Man @ Work, 2003
 "Beautiful World", by Collective Soul from Hints Allegations and Things Left Unsaid, 1993
 "Beautiful World", by Dierks Bentley from Feel That Fire, 2009
 "Beautiful World", by Michael Bolton, representing Connecticut in the American Song Contest, 2022
 "Beautiful World", by Sara Jorge from R3MIX, 2007
 "The Beautiful World", by Ai Maeda, a theme from the light novel Kino's Journey (see below), 2003

Other uses
 Beautiful World (musician), Phil Sawyer (born 1947), English musician
 Beautiful World (TV series), a 2019 South Korean television series
 Kino's Journey: The Beautiful World, a 2003 Japanese light novel series by Keiichi Sigsawa
 A Beautiful World, a journal published 1893–c. 1922 by the Scapa Society